is a passenger railway station in located in the town of  Taiki, Watarai District, Mie Prefecture, Japan, operated by Central Japan Railway Company (JR Tōkai).

Lines

Station layout
The station consists of two opposed side platforms, connected by a footbridge. The station is unattended.

Platforms

History 
Ise-Kashiwazaki Station opened on 3 July 1927 as a station on the Japanese Government Railways (JGR) Kisei-East Line. The line was extended on to Ōuchiyama Station on 13 November 1927. The JGR became the Japan National Railways (JNR) after World War 2, and the line was renamed the Kisei Main Line on 15 July 1959. The station has been unattended since 21 December 1983. The station was absorbed into the JR Central network upon the privatization of the JNR on 1 April 1987.

Passenger statistics
In fiscal 2019, the station was used by an average of 86 passengers daily (boarding passengers only).

Surrounding area
Taiki Municipal Taiki Junior High School
Ouchiyama River
Nishiki fishing port

See also
List of railway stations in Japan

References

External links

  JR Central timetable 

Railway stations in Japan opened in 1927
Railway stations in Mie Prefecture
Taiki, Mie